"La India María" (born María Nicolasa Cruz) is a fictional character portrayed and created by actress María Elena Velasco. The character frequently endures situations of racial discrimination, classism, and corruption, although in all of these turmoils, María undoubtedly resolves them with hilarious acts of good-nature and morality. She has represented the poor indigenous, the migrant worker, and even free-spirited nuns for over 30 years. She has been the lead character in 16 films and in a spin-off television series entitled, Ay María Qué Puntería. Most recently, the character has appeared in cameo appearances in the television programs Mujer, casos de la vida real and La familia P. Luche.

Fictional character background
In her first film, she mentions that her hometown is "San José de los Burros". Nevertheless, different hometowns are suggested in other films. For example, her hometown is changed to "Chipitongo el Alto", for which she serves a term as municipal president in La presidenta municipal (1975). In El que no corre... vuela! (1981), she mentions her hometown as "San Pablo Cuatro Venados". Other given hometowns are Nopalillo (Little Prickly Pear Cactus), San Bartolo Tezmelucan, among others.

Commute to Mexico City
Since La India María's rural hometown does not have many job opportunities, her cousin Eufemia invites her to work for a sophisticated aristocratic woman who is the countess of Valley of Mexico, in Mexico City. Her name is Doña Julia Escandón de León, Condesa del Valle. But María is robbed right when she gets off her train. With nowhere to go, María sells oranges with other women at a public park (which is illegal). A group of police officers arrest them, but María Nicolasa finds refuge in Doña Julia's limousine.

Migration to the United States
María was hired several times to work in the United States. First in OK, Mister Pancho, where she crosses the border to Houston, Texas at the request of an American refugee with whom she quickly falls in love and names "Mr. Pancho". Second in Ni de aquí ni de allá, she travels to Los Angeles, California and is contracted to work as a housemaid for two American tourists, Mr. and Mrs. Wilson. However, she is distracted and goes into a bathroom at the airport in L. A., and witnesses a murder. The murderer pursues her all over the city, as she finds work in a Mexican restaurant, and then as a maid for a sick American entrepreneur, who ends up being a drug trafficker that is arrested at the end.

Cameo appearances
In Mujer, casos de la vida real, an episode entitled Amor incondicional, she portrays a discriminated maid and nanny.
In La familia P. Luche, she appears in an episode as the housemaid of "Exelsa".

She also had cameos in the dramedy series Papá Soltero and the comedy show La hora pico.

References

External links
María Nicolasa Cruz on IMDb

Comedy film characters
Comedy television characters
Female characters in film
Female characters in television
Fictional artisans
Film characters introduced in 1972
Fictional farmers
Fictional indigenous peoples in Mexico
Fictional politicians
Fictional maids